Marcel Faure (5 March 1905 – 10 October 1984) was a French fencer. He competed in the individual and team sabre events at the 1936 Summer Olympics.

References

External links
 

1905 births
1984 deaths
French male sabre fencers
Olympic fencers of France
Fencers at the 1936 Summer Olympics